Masaru Gokita (born September 29, 1970) is a Japanese mixed martial artist. He competed in the Bantamweight division.

Mixed martial arts record

|-
| Loss
| align=center| 1-5-2
| Yasuhiro Urushitani
| Decision (unanimous)
| Shooto: Treasure Hunt 4
| 
| align=center| 2
| align=center| 5:00
| Setagaya, Tokyo, Japan
| 
|-
| Draw
| align=center| 1-4-2
| Toshiteru Ishii
| Draw
| GCM: The Contenders X-Rage 1
| 
| align=center| 2
| align=center| 5:00
| Tokyo, Japan
| 
|-
| Loss
| align=center| 1-4-1
| Hiroaki Yoshioka
| KO (head kick)
| Shooto: R.E.A.D. 10
| 
| align=center| 1
| align=center| 0:17
| Tokyo, Japan
| 
|-
| Draw
| align=center| 1-3-1
| Mamoru Yamaguchi
| Draw
| Shooto: R.E.A.D. 2
| 
| align=center| 2
| align=center| 5:00
| Tokyo, Japan
| 
|-
| Loss
| align=center| 1-3
| Takeyasu Hirono
| Decision (unanimous)
| Shooto: Renaxis 4
| 
| align=center| 2
| align=center| 5:00
| Tokyo, Japan
| 
|-
| Win
| align=center| 1-2
| Masaki Nishizawa
| Decision (unanimous)
| Shooto: Las Grandes Viajes 6
| 
| align=center| 2
| align=center| 5:00
| Tokyo, Japan
| 
|-
| Loss
| align=center| 0-2
| Jin Akimoto
| Decision (majority)
| Shooto: Las Grandes Viajes 5
| 
| align=center| 2
| align=center| 5:00
| Tokyo, Japan
| 
|-
| Loss
| align=center| 0-1
| Mitsuhiro Sakamoto
| Decision (majority)
| Shooto: Reconquista 2
| 
| align=center| 2
| align=center| 5:00
| Tokyo, Japan
|

See also
List of male mixed martial artists

References

External links
 

1970 births
Japanese male mixed martial artists
Bantamweight mixed martial artists
Living people